Gamleborg, also known as Gamleborg Viking Fortress, was the first fortification on the Danish island of Bornholm. Built around 750 AD, it was the seat of the kings of Bornholm during the Viking age (750–1050) and early Middle Ages (1050–1150).

History
The fortress is Bornholm's oldest defence works. Its builder is unknown, but an account of the Baltic Sea travels of Wulfstan of Hedeby in 890 tells us that Bornholm already had its own king at the time. There is, however, firm evidence that the fortress was in use during the reigns of Harald Bluetooth (940–986) and Canute IV (1080–1086). Gamleborg was used as refuge during the tenth century against Viking raids. Gamleborg was abandoned in 1150, the occupants moving to Lilleborg, only  to the northwest. It is not known why the move was made but it does not appear to have been the result of hostilities. Excavations in the 1950s showed the fortifications originated in the Viking period although there is evidence the site was used as a hideout in the Iron Age. The ruins that can be seen today are mainly the result of reconstruction work completed in about 1100.

Architecture
Part of the wall, built of rocks and boulders set in clay, is still in good condition, and the outline of the fort is still remarkably clear given its age.

Grounds
The fort is located on a hill almost in the centre of the island, part of the Almindingen forest. It is several hundred yards off the main road from Rønne to Svaneke. A water pool, located on the northwestern side was the main water supply to the fortress. The ruins are situated in mounds.

The defences first consisted of huge ramparts built of large boulders, consolidated with earth and clay. There were initially gates to the north and south with additional protection from moats and outer ramparts. There were several buildings for the occupants and their stores. Two stone lined embankments can still be seen aside the west entrance. The north gate was significantly widened and there was probably a watchtower on the northwest corner of the rampart. The old south gate was walled up and replaced by a larger entrance on the southwest corner.

References

750
Buildings and structures completed in the 8th century
Ruins in Denmark
Forts in Denmark
Castles in Denmark
Germanic archaeological sites
Archaeological sites in Denmark
Viking buildings and structures
Buildings and structures in Bornholm